"Fade into Darkness" is a song by Swedish house producer and DJ Avicii. It features uncredited vocals from Andreas Moe. The single was released on 22 July 2011. The song incorporates elements from "Perpetuum Mobile" by Penguin Cafe Orchestra, as written by Simon Jeffes. Prior to its commercial release, the song was referred to as "Penguin", which was solely an instrumental track, unlike the following lyrical version.

Leona Lewis controversy
When "Fade into Darkness" was referred to as "Penguin", the song received comparisons to Leona Lewis' 2011 song "Collide". The song ("Collide") originally credited Lewis as the only artist on the track, which prompted a lawsuit against Lewis, and her record label Syco, as Avicii claimed that they had sampled "Penguin" without his permission. According to Avicii's manager Ash Pournouri, he thought that Lewis was going to only sample the original "Perpetuum Mobile" by Penguin Cafe Orchestra. In a statement, Pournouri said "We were under the impression that they were going to sample the original. They ended up copying our version. We never allowed Syco to replay our version of the track. The original sample rights belong to Simon Jeffes (Penguin Cafe Orchestra) and approval for using that composition is not in our control." As part of the lawsuit for not receiving credit on "Collide", Avicii attempted to have the release of the song suspended until an agreement was reached.

Prior to the case reaching the high court, Lewis tweeted that Avicii was fully aware of his song being sampled on "Collide", "With regards to my song, Avicii was aware & agreeing publishing splits for himself and his manager. When Avicii sent his track out to have a song written over it I totally fell in love with this version and I think he's super talented." Syco also responded to the claim, stating that Avicii was always going to work with Lewis, and that he would be credited on the song. In response, Avicii accused Lewis and her label of lying about working together, and tweeted "Thanks for accusing me of lying and speaking on my behalf. Since we never met or even spoke, please let me and my manager know who told you that and what confirmation they gave you." Hours before both Lewis's and Avicii's record labels were supposed to appear in the high court, Syco released a statement that both record labels had reached an agreement and that Avicii would appear as a featured artist on "Collide", whilst Lewis would appear as the lead artist. Avicii and his record label were pleased with the result, with the former saying "Glad to FINALLY have resolved situation with Leona. Music is the answer ... We've finally come to an agreement with Leona on all the issues ... So happy to move on and focus on hit making ... So happy to move on with Leona and focus on having a hit together." The latter stated "Avicii is an up-and-coming talent; we think he should be given a fair crack at making this record the hit it deserves to be."

Music video
The music video for "Fade into Darkness" was directed by Tobias Hansson and Karl Aulin, starring Linn Asplund and Jim Cargill. The video portrays a female assassin who fell for her target. To protect him, she left him a note that said not to look for her. But he did and when he finds her she eventually kills him.

Track listing
Digital EP
"Fade into Darkness" (Vocal Radio Mix) – 3:18
"Fade into Darkness" (Vocal Club Mix) – 6:09
"Fade into Darkness" (Instrumental Radio Mix) – 2:58
"Fade into Darkness" (Instrumental Club Mix) – 5:48

Credits and personnel
Tim Bergling – songwriter, producer
Arash Pournouri – songwriter, producer
Simon Jeffes – songwriter
John Martin – songwriter
Michel Zitron – songwriter
Måns Wredenberg – songwriter
Dipesh Parmar – arrangement
Andreas Moe – lead vocals
Richard Adlam – backing vocals
Sam Blue – backing vocals
Simon Chapman – backing vocals
Hal Ritson – vocal producer, backing vocals
Wez Clarke – mixing, additional programming

Credits adapted from liner notes.

Charts and certifications

Weekly charts

Year-end charts

Certifications

Release history

References

2011 songs
Songs written by Michel Zitron
Songs written by Avicii
Songs written by John Martin (singer)
Avicii songs
Songs written by Arash Pournouri